Matthew Couch (born 30 June 1974) is an English former professional snooker player.

Career 
During a professional career lasting from 1992 to 2012, Couch had little success in ranking events, although he reached the quarter-finals of the UK Championship in 1998, and his highest break is 141 from 2002. 
He returned to the Main Tour for the 2008/2009 season, and survived due to a fine run in the World Championship qualifiers, including a 10–3 victory over former champion John Parrott. In October 2010, Couch had one of his best results to date, reaching the final of the 2010 Brugge Open, where he lost 4–2 against former World Champion Shaun Murphy. He dropped off the snooker tour at the end of the 2011–12 season.

Personal life 
Couch is also an official World Snooker coach, and currently resides in Scunthorpe.

Performance and rankings timeline

Career finals

Minor-ranking finals: 1

Non-ranking finals: 4 (1 title)

Pro-am finals: 14 (7 titles)

Team finals: 1

References

External links 

 Profile on worldsnooker.com
Profile on Pro Snooker Blog

English snooker players
Living people
1974 births
Place of birth missing (living people)
Sportspeople from Scunthorpe